The Posted county price (PCP) is calculated for the so-called loan commodities (except for rice and cotton) for each county by the Farm Service Agency. The PCP reflects changes in prices in major terminal grain markets (of which there are 18 in the country), corrected for the cost of transporting grain from the county to the terminal. It is utilized under the marketing loan repayment provisions and loan deficiency payment (LDP) provisions of the commodity programs. Rice and cotton use an adjusted world price as the proxy for local market prices.

References 

Agricultural economics